Carlos Semino (3 May 1929 – 22 January 2014) was an Argentine rower. He competed in the men's coxed four event at the 1948 Summer Olympics.

References

External links
 

1929 births
2014 deaths
Argentine male rowers
Olympic rowers of Argentina
Rowers at the 1948 Summer Olympics
Place of birth missing